The Church of the Immaculate Conception of the Virgin Mary is a Roman Catholic church in Venta, Akmenė District, Lithuania. It belongs to the Diocese of Telšiai. It was constructed in 2009.

History 
In 1991, the parish was founded and a temporary house of prayer was established in a former kindergarten. The church was completed in 2009. Its main patrons were the family of Ivanas Paleičikas.

The church is also called the Lithuanian Millennium Church because it was the only church built in Lithuania in 2009.

The church was designed by architects Vytautas Marcinkus and Regina Miceikienė. It was built by Akmeresta using German sourced materials.

Architecture 
The building is frame and white brick, rectangular plan with one non-projecting tower, and a three-walled apse. The facades have thermal insulation finishing panels. The church has a rectangular tower, and two bays with a pyramidal roof. The windows are mainly semi-circular and arched. The interior is rear, with one nave. There is no ceiling, and expressive constructions are suspended in their place. The church bell was brought by the pastor Anupras Gauronskas from Germany.

References 

Roman Catholic churches in Lithuania
Akmenė District Municipality
Roman Catholic churches completed in 2009
2009 establishments in Lithuania